Rebecca Ore is the pseudonym of science fiction writer Rebecca B. Brown.  She was born in Louisville, Kentucky in 1948. In 1968 she moved to New York City and attended Columbia University.  Rebecca Ore is known for the Becoming Alien series and her short stories.

Her novel Time's Child was published by Eos (HarperCollins) in February 2007. Centuries Ago and Very Fast, described as a "collection of linked stories", was published by Aqueduct Press in April 2009.

Awards
Ore was shortlisted for the John W. Campbell Award for Best New Writer in 1988. Becoming Alien and Being Alien were each nominated for a Philip K. Dick Award in 1988 and 1989. Her short story "Accelerated Grimace" was shortlisted for an Otherwise Award in 1998. Centeries Ago and Very Fast was a finalist for the 2010 Lambda Literary award in LGBT science fiction, fantasy and horror.

Bibliography

Becoming Alien Series

Novels

Novel/collection of linked stories
 Centuries Ago and Very Fast (2009)

References

External links
 
 Rebecca Ore bibliography

1948 births
Living people
American science fiction writers
American women novelists
20th-century American novelists
21st-century American novelists
Women science fiction and fantasy writers
Cyberpunk writers
20th-century American women writers
21st-century American women writers
Writers from Louisville, Kentucky
Novelists from Kentucky
Kentucky women writers
Pseudonymous women writers
20th-century pseudonymous writers
21st-century pseudonymous writers